Mark Robert Boals (born December 5, 1958) is an American heavy metal vocalist and occasional bassist, best known for his vocals with Yngwie Malmsteen. He is currently a member of the band Foundry.

Boals' first album with Malmsteen, 1986's Trilogy, achieved platinum status in the US and sold several million copies worldwide. As a young child, he learned to play the piano and bass guitar.  Although Boals has never had any vocal lessons or training, as a teenager he gained experience as a vocalist in local groups. Boals is the founder and vocalist for the band Ring of Fire, and had a brief stint as the bassist for Dokken.

Career 
In 1982, Boals joined Savoy Brown and toured around Canada and the U.S. through 1983. Although several songs were written for a proposed new album, the record never materialized due to mainman Kim Simmonds running into legal problems at the time. During these years Boals also performed with his band Lazer.

While with Savoy Brown, Boals met Ted Nugent and joined his band as bassist in 1984 touring throughout the U.S. and opening up for Judas Priest in Europe. Deciding to focus on singing and being a frontman, Boals moved to California in 1985.  He joined Yngwie Malmsteen's Rising Force and performed on the Trilogy album.  Boals' first show with Malmsteen was at Day on the Green in San Francisco, CA in front of 80,000 fans.  After leaving Yngwie in 1986, he gave up music for a time, trying to find himself in cinematography and working for Warner Brothers. In this period he recorded, with Mike Slamer, a soundtrack for the film White Water Summer (1987); he also appeared on Maestro Alex Gregory's "Paganini's Last Stand" (Priority Records) in 1992.

Boals' next venture was Billionaires Boys Club, a short lived supergroup featuring former Accept guitarist Jörg Fischer, future HammerFall bassist Magnus Rosén, and former Yngwie Malmsteen bandmate, drummer Anders Johansson. The group's sole album, Something Wicked Comes, was released on Polydor Records in 1993.

Then in 1996, Yngwie Malmsteen called Boals and asked if he wanted to perform on several songs on the cover album Inspiration. Boals accepted, and resumed his role as vocalist with Yngwie Malmsteen for the album Alchemy. The band subsequently went on tour.

In March 2000, Boals won the No.1 Vocalist Prize in the Japanese music magazines Burrn! and Young Guitar. At the end of that year, on the same day, his second solo CD, entitled Ring Of Fire and Yngwie Malmsteen's War To End All Wars, with Boals on vocals, were released. However, after many years of musical magic and friendship, the team of Malmsteen and Boals had decided to move in different directions, and Boals formed a new band, Ring of Fire, named after his solo album. At the beginning of this year, Ring of Fire recorded their subsequent debut The Oracle album at the George Bellas Studios in Chicago. Alongside Boals were George Bellas, Vitalij Kuprij, Virgil Donati and Philip Bynoe.

In addition Boals has participated in two exciting projects of Lion Music in Finland. He appears on the Jason Becker tribute "Warmth in the Wilderness", singing a version of David Lee Roth's "Hammerhead Shark" with Lars Eric Mattsson. Speaking about Mattsson, in 2005 he also recorded an album War with Boals lead singing on track "Deep In The Shadows". As Malmsteen urgently needed a singer for his current tour, Boals has toured again with him in Europe, but only as guest vocalist.

Also Boals is featured on vocals on two songs, "Into The Light" and "I Will Always Be There", for the Empire CD Hypnotica (2001). Another cool project where Boals took part in, was "Genius Rock Opera" Trilogy by Daniele Liverani. There he was recording as the main character (Genius) on Episode 1: A human into dreams' world (2002) and Episode 2: In search of the little prince (2004). But he refused to sing on the last Episode because of personal reasons and was replaced by D. C. Cooper. In 2004 Boals recorded two songs for young Japanese guitarist named Takayoshi Ohmura. Ohmura's debut album, entitled "Nowhere To Go", features additional guest appearances by Doogie White (Yngwie Malmsteen, Cornerstone, ex-Rainbow) and Richie Kotzen (ex-Mr. Big, Poison). Commented Boals:
After I was asked by the representatives of Ohmura, I listened to his demo. I thought his music was good and he has a talent to play guitar, and I thought it'd be great to support this young Japanese musician. I also thought it would be great to share the vocals with the other singers, Richie Kotzen and Doogie White, so I recorded two songs here in L.A. and sent them to Japan.

Boals has also performed with Lana Lane, Indigo Dying, Empire and Chris Brooks.

2000s years Boals recorded 3 solo albums as well as three studio albums and one live DVD with his own band, Ring Of Fire. The project album called The Codex Boals recorded with Magnus Karlsson in 2007. The album project marks the return to recording after a 3 years hiatus for Boals. In 2007 Boals started looking for a serious, permanent band situation and Royal Hunt became a perfect opportunity for a singer to exploit and expand his vocal abilities.

In 2008 Boals appeared on his first Royal Hunt album Collision Course... Paradox 2.  Boals also appeared on Uli Jon Roth's album titled Under A Dark Sky on which he shared vocal duties with Liz Vandall. The band with Boals toured the world from July – December 2008. In 2009, he also worked with such bands like Vindictiv and Wolf, and completed work on the latest Royal Hunt album X which was released in January 2010. Mark is also currently handling vocal duties in the band Seven The Hardway featuring guitarist Tony MacAlpine which released a self-titled album in August 2010.

A press release dated June 19, 2011, announced that Boals would be recording vocals for the Wagnerian opera metal project Lyraka.

In 2012, he sang lead vocals for Joshua Perahia's band and their album, "Resurrection".

Since 2013, he performed with Dio Disciples, replacing former Judas Priest singer Tim "Ripper" Owens.

After singing backing vocals on Dokken's 2012 album Broken Bones and performing acoustic shows with Don Dokken for the past couple of years, Boals was announced as the new full-time Dokken bass player in November 2014 replacing Sean McNabb.

Boals also appears on an EP project from the band Metal Hell called Decadence, which includes Mark Zonder from Fates Warning

2014 he started performing in the Las Vegas show, "Raiding the Rock Vault", as lead vocalists, and also plays guitar and bass.

2019 Boals started performing with other Las Vegas show called "Tenors of Rock".

Boals also now sings with the rock band Foundry whom are actively producing and performing concerts to audiences worldwide. Foundry is currently working with producer Colin Brittain.

Discography 

Solo albums 
Ignition (1998)
Ring of Fire (2000)
Edge of the World (2002)
All The Best! (2020)

Yngwie J. Malmsteen 
Trilogy (1986)
Inspiration (1996)
Alchemy (1999)
War to End All Wars (2000)

Foundry 

 Single – THUNDER ROLLS (2019)
 Single – INTOXICATE (2019)
 Single – NOT THIS TIME (2019)
 Single – ANOTHER WAY (2021)
 Single – LET YOU GO (2021)
 Single – WAITING FOR YOU (2021)

Shining Black ft. Mark Boals/Olaf Thorsen 

 Shining Black (2020)
 Postcards From The End Of The World (2022)

Renaissance Rock Orchestra 
A Song of Hope (2021)

Maestro Alex Gregory 
Paganini's Last Stand (1992)

Billionaires Boys Club 
Something Wicked Comes (1993)

Thread 
Thread (1996)

Lana Lane 
Project Shangri-La (2002)

Erik Norlander 
Music Machine (2003)

Ring of Fire 
The Oracle (2001)
Burning Live in Tokyo – live album (2002)
Dreamtower (2003)
Lapse of Reality (2004)
Battle of Leningrad (2014)
Gravity (2022)

Empire 
Hypnotica (2001)

Genius A Rock Opera 
Part 1: A Human into Dreams' World (2002)
Part 2: In Search of the Little Prince (2004)

Takayoshi Ohmura 
Nowhere to Go (2004)

Lars Eric Mattsson 
War (2005)

Indigo Dying 
Indigo Dying (2007)

The Codex 
The Codex (2007)

Royal Hunt 
Collision Course... Paradox 2 (2008)
X (2010)
Royal Hunt – Dystopia (2020)
Royal Hunt – Dystopia Part 2 (2022)

Uli Jon Roth 
Under A Dark Sky (Sky of Avalon) (2008)

Adrian Galysh 
Tone Poet (2013)

Vindictiv 
Ground Zero (2009)
World Of Fear (2015)

Wolf 
Ravenous (2009, backing vocals on one song)

Seven the Hardway 
Seven The Hardway (2010)

Jayce Landberg 
Good Sleepless Night (2010, Track 8)

Iron Mask 
Black as Death (2011)
Fifth Son of Winterdoom (2013)

Holy Force 
 Holy Force (2011)

Bogusław Balcerak's Crylord 
Blood of the Prophets (2011) (tracks 4, 6, 11, 12)
Gates of Valhalla (2014) (tracks 3, 9)

Kuni 
Rock (2011)

Lyraka 
Lyraka Volume 2 (2012)

Joshua Perahia 
Resurrection (2012)

Magnus Karlsson 
Free Fall (2013, one song)

RavenBlack Project 
 Breaking Through the Mist (2013)

Thunder Rising 
 Thunder Rising (2013)

Marius Danielsen 
 Legend of Valley Doom (2013)

Dramatica 
  Fall of Tyranny (2016)

Vivaldi Metal Project 
 The Four Seasons (2016)

Ark Storm 
 Voyage of the rage (2018)

Tribute albums 
Dragon Attack: A Tribute to Queen (1997)
We Will Rock You: A Tribute to Queen (2000)
Warmth in the Wilderness: A Tribute To Jason Becker (2001)
24/7/365: A Tribute To Led Zeppelin (2007)

Soundtracks 
"Restless heart" from the film "White Water Summer" (1987)
Soundtrack recorded with Mike Slamer.

References

External links 

Foundry Official Website
Interview with Boals @ houseofshred.com
Empire Rock Biography

1958 births
Living people
Musicians from Youngstown, Ohio
American heavy metal singers
American rock bass guitarists
American heavy metal bass guitarists
American male bass guitarists
American male singers
Guitarists from Ohio
20th-century American bass guitarists
20th-century American pianists
Royal Hunt members
Labyrinth (band) members
Iron Mask (band) members
Joshua (band) members
American male pianists
21st-century American pianists
20th-century American male musicians
21st-century American male musicians
Yngwie J. Malmsteen's Rising Force members